Kumaonis, also known as  Kumaiye and Kumain (in Nepal), are an Indo-Aryan ethno-linguistic group who speak Kumaoni language as their first-language and live mostly in Kumaon region in the Indian Himalayas .

Kumaoni is also used as an  address for people who have their origin in Kumaon. The word Kumain is a direct derivative of Kumaoni.

History
Worshipping Vishnu and Shiva is predominant in this region. According to Skanda Purana. Kumaon is believed to be the birth place of Kurma avtar of Hindu god Vishnu.

Kurmanchal Kingdom 
Kurmanchal kingdom was a medieval kingdom of Kumaon. it was established by Vasudeo Katyuri and capital was Baijnath, it was one of the oldest Himalayan kingdoms and unified most of the Himalayas and was extended from Sikkim in the east to Kabul in the west at its peak, after the fall of the kingdom it was divided into 8 different princely states. The next ruling clan of Kumaon was 'Manrals' the dynasty at its peak controlled Tons to Karnail river. Kumaon was one of the few countries of South Asia that were never ruled or conquered by any Muslim dynasties.

British Raj

There was widespread opposition to British rule in various parts of Kumaon. The Kumaoni people, especially from the Champawat District, rose in rebellion against the British during the Indian Rebellion of 1857. Under the leadership of Kalu Singh Mahara, many Kumaonis also joined the Indian National Army led by Subash Chandra Bose during the Second World War.

In other countries
In Nepal there are certain castes of Brahmins who migrated from Kumaon to Nepal during the medieval period now characterized as 'Kumain Bahun' or 'Kumai Bahuns'.

Language

UNESCO designated Kumaoni as language in the endangered and unsafe category which requires consistent conservation efforts.

Culture

Traditional attire
There are various attires worn in Kumaon.

Pichhaura is a notable traditional attire of Kumaoni women generally worn for religious occasions, marriage, and other rituals. Traditionally handmade using vegetable dyes, Pichhauras are available in red and saffron. Local designs made in Almora, Haldwani and other parts of Kumaon use silk fabric and accessories made of pearl. It is also contemporarily made using machines.

Kumaoni men wear Kumaoni cap, which is a black colour headgear. Apart from it, white colour Kumaoni cap is used during festivals, especially, during Kumaoni holi.

Festivals
After harvesting season people mostly relax, rejoice, dance and sing, and thus a festival is generated. At the transition of the sun from one constellation to another Sankranti is observed. Each Sankranti has a fair or festival connected to it somewhere in Kumaon. Fooldeyi, Bikhauti, Harela, Ghee Sankranti, Khatarua, Ghughutiya are the most-observed Sankranties throughout the region. Other festivals have the bearings in the moon and thus the dates change frequently in the Gregorian Calendar. Basant Panchami, Shiv Ratri, Saton–Athon, Kumauni Holi, Uttarayani, Samvatsar Parwa, Ram Navami, Dashra, Batsavitri, Rakshabandhan, Janmastmi, Nandastmi, and Deepawali are some of the auspicious occasions.

Dashain or Vijaydashmi

Dasshera festival starts in Kumaon with the performance of Ramlila, which is itself unique as it is based on the musical rendering of the katha or story of Rama based on the theatrical traditions set by Uday Shankar while on his stay in Almora. These traditions were further enriched by Mohan Upreti and Brijendra Lal Sah. Known as the Almora or Kumaon style, Ramlila has been recognised by UNESCO as one of the representative styles of Ramlila in India. The 150-year-old Kumaoni Ramlila was declared as the longest running opera in the world by UNESCO.

Folk dances
Chholiya is popular dance in Kumaon region. It is the oldest folk-dance of Uttarakhand.
Jhoda and Chanchari are other folk dances of Kumaon.

Theatre
Kumaoni theatre, which developed through its 'Ramleela' plays, later evolved into a modern theatre form through the efforts of theatre stalwarts like Mohan Upreti and Dinesh Pandey and groups like 'Parvatiya Kala Kendra' (started by Mohan Upreti) and 'Parvatiya Lok Kala Manch'. Besides this the famous Hindi poet, Sumitranandan Pant also hailed from Kausani, district Bageshwar.

Radio
 Trans World Radio (USA) – 7320 Hz (Shortwave)

Cuisine

Kumaoni food is simple and comprises largely of vegetables and pulses. Vegetables like potato (aaloo), radish (mooli), colocacia leaves (arbi ke patte, papad), pumpkin (kaddoo), spinach (palak) and many others are grown locally by the largely agrarian populace and consumed in various forms.

Population
In 2011, the census reported a total of 2,081,057 Kumaoni speaker in India, constituting 0.17% of the country's population.

In Kumaon
As per 2011 Indian census, there were 1,981,062 (95.19%) Kumaoni speakers in the Kumaon division.

Kumaoni diaspora
There is a large Kumaoni diaspora in other states as well as outside India. However, due to the usage and acceptance of Hindi as their mother tongue, many Kumaonis do not list the Kumaoni language as their mother tongue. Hence there is an absence of data number of ethnic Kumaonis living outside Kumaon.

Kumaoni speakers in other Indian states
Source:

International diaspora
There is a large Kumaoni diaspora in neighbouring Nepal, because of Katyuri and Kumaon Kingdom. The actual speakers of Kumaoni in other countries, however, are not known. Though there is a presence of Kumaoni speakers outside India and Nepal, especially in Western countries. The Kumaoni NRIs are again returning to their culture with more awareness and concern about its importance and survival.

Notable people

See also

 Kumaoni (disambiguation)
Maneaters of Kumaon
Kumaon Regiment
Garhwali people

References

Kumaon division
 
Social groups of Uttarakhand
Ethnic groups in India
Khas people
Indo-Aryan peoples